Caldas is a department of Colombia named after Colombian patriotic figure Francisco José de Caldas. It is part of the Paisa Region and its capital is Manizales. The population of Caldas is 998,255, and its area is 7,291 km². Caldas is also part of the Colombian Coffee-Growers Axis region along with the Risaralda and Quindio departments.

Subdivisions

Municipalities

 Aguadas
 Anserma
 Aranzazu
 Belalcázar
 Chinchiná
 Filadelfia
 La Dorada
 La Merced
 Manizales
 Manzanares
 Marmato
 Marquetalia
 Marulanda
 Neira
 Norcasia
 Pácora
 Palestina
 Pensilvania
 Riosucio
 Risaralda
 Salamina
 Samaná
 San José
 Supía
 Victoria
 Villamaría
 Viterbo

Districts
Caldas has 6 districts.

Dams 
In Caldas is the Miel I Dam.

Demography 

The population of Caldas is 984,128 (2013), half of whom live in Manizales. The racial composition is:
White / Mestizo (93.16%)
Amerindian or Indigenous (4.29%)
Black or Afro-Colombian (2.54%)

The local inhabitants of Caldas are known as caldenses. Of the five main regional groups in Colombia, the predominant group in Caldas are known as paisa, referring to those living in the Paisa region, which covers most of Antioquia, as well as the departments of Caldas, Risaralda and Quindío.

References

External links

Government of Caldas official website 

 
Departments of Colombia
States and territories established in 1905
1905 establishments in Colombia